The Toyota Stallion is a nameplate used on three different pickup truck models by Toyota:

 Toyota Stallion (K40), a rebadged second-generation Toyota Stout for the South African market, 1965–1978.
 Toyota Stallion (F40), a rebadged third-generation Toyota Kijang for the South African market, 1986–1996.
 Toyota Stallion (F60), a rebadged fourth-generation Toyota Kijang for the South African market, 1996–2013.

Stallion